Zebinnus of Antioch was the bishop of Antioch between 231 and 237 A.D. or 232 and 240 A.D. (depending on the source).  According Eusebius of Caesarea, his bishopric coincided with the regence of Severus Alexander and Maximinus Thrax, Zebinnus was the successor of Philetus of Antioch on the Antioch see.

References

 

Patriarchs of Antioch
Early Christianity